Cora Cecilia Pinedo Alonso (born 26 November 1967) is a Mexican politician from the New Alliance Party. From 2009 to 2012 she served as Deputy of the LXI Legislature of the Mexican Congress representing Nayarit.

References

1967 births
Living people
Politicians from Nayarit
Women members of the Chamber of Deputies (Mexico)
Members of the Chamber of Deputies (Mexico) for Nayarit
New Alliance Party (Mexico) politicians
21st-century Mexican politicians
21st-century Mexican women politicians
Senators of the LXIV and LXV Legislatures of Mexico
Members of the Congress of Nayarit
Municipal presidents of Tepic
Women mayors of places in Mexico
Deputies of the LXI Legislature of Mexico
Members of the Senate of the Republic (Mexico) for Nayarit
Women members of the Senate of the Republic (Mexico)